Birdwood may refer to:

Places
In Australia
Birdwood, New South Wales
Birdwood, South Australia

In Canada
 Mount Birdwood, a mountain in Alberta, Canada

In the United States
Birdwood, Nebraska, an unincorporated community
Birdwood (Thomasville, Georgia), listed on the National Register of Historic Places in Thomas County, Georgia
Birdwood (Charlottesville, Virginia), listed on the National Register of Historic Places in Albemarle County, Virginia

Individuals
George Christopher Molesworth Birdwood (1832 – 1917), Anglo-Indian official and naturalist
Herbert Mills Birdwood (1837 – 1907), British administrator in India
William Birdwood, 1st Baron Birdwood (1865 – 1951), British general
Christopher Birdwood, 2nd Baron Birdwood (1899 – 1962), British peer
Jane Birdwood, Baroness Birdwood (1913 – 2000), British political activist

See also
 Birdwoodton, Victoria